Kibara coriacea is a plant in the family Monimiaceae. The specific epithet  is from the Latin meaning "leathery", referring to the leaves.

Description
The smooth bark is pale grey. The fruits are considered edible.

Distribution and habitat
Kibara coriacea grows naturally in India, in Indonesia and Malaysia (including Borneo), and in Singapore. Its habitat is lowland rain forests and lower montane forests from sea-level to  altitude.

References

Monimiaceae
Flora of India (region)
Flora of Malesia
Taxonomy articles created by Polbot